Groß Weeden is a district of the municipality Rondeshagen in Schleswig-Holstein, Germany.

References

Geography of Schleswig-Holstein